Rožni Vrh is a small settlement on the left bank of the Temenica River, just west of Trebnje in eastern Slovenia. The area is part of the historical region of Lower Carniola. The Municipality of Trebnje is now included in the Southeast Slovenia Statistical Region.

References

External links
Rožni Vrh at Geopedia

Populated places in the Municipality of Trebnje